Timothy Richmond (born September 12, 1998) is an American professional stock car racing driver who competes part-time in the ARCA Menards Series driving the No. 27 car for his team, Richmond Motorsports.

Racing career

Prior to driving in the ARCA Menards Series, Richmond competed in a road racing series.

Richmond made his debut in ARCA and stock car racing as a whole at Five Flags in 2019 driving for Wayne Peterson in his team's No. 06 car. Although he did finish 25 laps down (in 14th), he left the team impressed, as he was able to finish the race, something the team had not been able to accomplish much with other drivers. Being an underfunded team, WPR was still competing with steel-bodied cars, which ARCA was starting to shift away from. So, Richmond raced against newer cars and made it to the finish of the race in an older car. After that, the team quickly signed him on for more races, which later turned out to be almost a full-season effort. He also joined the battle for rookie of the year in 2019. Richmond would go on to finish eighth in points that season, although largely because the series had few full-time drivers that year. It was the highest points finish and first one in the top-10 for one of Wayne Peterson's drivers, topping teammate Con Nicolopolous' two consecutive 11th-place finishes in the standings the previous two years when he ran nearly the full season both years.

It was revealed in an article on the ARCA website on December 23, 2019, that Richmond would return to the Peterson team and run the full season in 2020.

Richmond and Peterson started the 2020 season off with an 18th-place finish at the season-opener at Daytona, and then a 23rd place DNF at Phoenix.

In 2021, Richmond left Peterson's team and started his team with fellow ARCA driver Alex Clubb, Richmond Clubb Motorsports. The team competed full-time in the series with both driver/co-owners sharing the car No. 27. The team also fielded second car at the Milwaukee Mile, meaning both drivers will be in that race. The cars and equipment that the Richmond family owned were also taken from WPR to RCM. The crew chief of the No. 06, Brad Frye, also moved over to the new team with Richmond. Richmond missed the rest of the reason after he was injured in a crash at Michigan when Drew Dollar hit him. For the 2022 season, Richmond drives solely for Richmond Motorsports after Alex Clubb returned to his own team Clubb Racing Inc.

Personal life
Richmond and his family live in Ottawa, Illinois. The Richmond family helped out Peterson's team and crew improve in the 2019 season, particularly having fast enough speed to qualify for races and buying newer equipment such as the new composite cars (which would eventually be required in ARCA). David Richmond, owner of Richmond Clubb Racing, is related to former NASCAR Cup Series driver Tim Richmond.

Motorsports career results

ARCA Menards Series
(key) (Bold – Pole position awarded by qualifying time. Italics – Pole position earned by points standings or practice time. * – Most laps led.)

ARCA Menards Series East

ARCA Menards Series West

 Season still in progress 
 Ineligible for series points

References

External links

 

1998 births
Living people
NASCAR drivers
ARCA Menards Series drivers
Racing drivers from Illinois
People from Ottawa, Illinois